Aechmea lueddemanniana is a species in the genus Aechmea. This species is native to Costa Rica, Guatemala, Belize, Honduras, Nicaragua and southern Mexico as far north as Veracruz.

The plant is widely cultivated as an ornamental.

Description
The pink flowers are tube-shaped and the flowering period extends from June to August.  The fruits are purplish berries. This plant prefers partially shaded areas.

Gallery

References

lueddemanniana
Flora of Central America
Flora of Mexico
Plants described in 1866
Garden plants